Dark Horse Miniatures is a set of miniatures published by Dark Horse.

Contents
Dark Horse Miniatures was a line of 25mm figures.

Reception
Bob Kindel reviewed Dark Horse Miniatures in Space Gamer No. 73. Kindel commented that "Dark Horse Miniatures: the company that dares to ask, 'Is Idaho doomed . . . or just uncomfortable?' Check them out."

History
Dark Horse Miniatures was a miniature company formed in 1979 that moved to Idaho in 1981. In 1984, they obtained the first-ever license granted by the TMNT creators, to manufacture 25mm Teenage Mutant Ninja Turtles miniatures. They also took on other comic book-related licenses, including Groo The Wanderer and the Robotech license from Harmony Gold.

References

See also
List of lines of miniatures

Miniature figures